Judith and Holofernes (Italian:Giuditta e Oloferne) is a 1929 Italian silent historical film directed by Baldassarre Negroni and starring Bartolomeo Pagano, Jia Ruskaja and Franz Sala. It was the final film of Pagano, who had been famous during the silent era for his portrayals of Maciste.

The film is based on the story of Judith Beheading Holofernes. A 1959 film, Judith and Holofernes, was also inspired by the tale.

Cast
 Bartolomeo Pagano
Jia Ruskaja 
Franz Sala 
Carlo Tedeschi
Giuseppe Brignone
Augusto Bandini
Felice Minotti 
Lore Lay 
 Giorgio Curti 
 Anna Mari 
 Andrea Bani
 Nino Altieri

See also
 Judith of Bethulia (1914)

References

Bibliography 
 Moliterno, Gino. The A to Z of Italian Cinema. Scarecrow Press, 2008.

External links 
 

1929 films
1920s historical drama films
Italian silent feature films
Italian historical drama films
Judith in film
1920s Italian-language films
Films directed by Baldassarre Negroni
Films about Jews and Judaism
1929 drama films
Silent drama films
1920s Italian films